The 1974 World Masters was a professional non-ranking snooker tournament held from 1 to 5 July 1974 at the Victorian Club in South Yarra, Melbourne, Australia. Cliff Thorburn won the title by defeating John Spencer 160–67 in the final. Thorburn, aged 26, was the youngest player in the event and the 8th seed.

The tournament started on 1 July. The eight players were divided into two round-robin groups to produce semi-finalists, with the semi-finals and final played on 5 July. The total prize fund was AUD20,000.

John Spencer beat Perrie Mans in the first semi-final, whilst Cliff Thorburn beat Eddie Charlton in the other semi-final.

The final was decided on the aggregate score across two . Thorburn led 81–29 after the first frame, and 160–67 at the conclusion, to win the title.

Seedings
Players were seeded as follows:

Group matches
Players in bold are match winners; "??" denotes that the result is missing.

Division 1

Division 2

References

1974 in snooker
1974 in Australian sport
July 1974 sports events in Australia
Snooker competitions in Australia